The traditional Albanian clothing includes more than 200 different varieties of clothing in all Albania and the Albanian-speaking territories and communities (including the Arbëreshë in Italy, Arvanites in Greece and Arbanasi in Croatia). Albania's recorded history of clothing goes back to classical times. It is one of the factors that has differentiated this nation from other European countries, dating back to the Illyrian period.

Almost every cultural and geographical region in the country has its own specific variety of costume that varies in detail, material, color, shape, and form. Albanian folk dress is often decorated with symbolic elements of Illyrian antique pagan origin, like suns, eagles, moons, stars, and snakes. Fabrics are traditionally made by weaving clothes using looms. To this day, some conservative old men and women mainly from the North wear traditional clothing in their daily lives. Instead, older women from the South usually wear all-black outfits.

Parts 

Albanian dress consists of the following

Headgear

Men 

The following headdresses are in use for men:

Qeleshe  or plis: a type of hat worn by men in Albania, Kosovo, and the Albanian-speaking parts of Greece and North Macedonia. In central Albania (Tirana, Durrës, Kavaja) it is cone-shaped, and in North Albania and Kosovo round.
 Albanian hat worn typically during the 15th to 18th centuries and immortalized in Onufri's paintings.
Qylafë : a woolen high hat worn in southern Albania.
Fez (hat)

Women 

The following headdresses are in use for women:
Kapica : a headdress for women.
Langi, other names include: peshqira, riza, marhamë, pashnik.
Lëvere : right shaped headdress.
Kryqe : square shaped headdress.

Pants and upper body covers
Fustanella : traditional skirt-like garment worn by men.
Tirqe : long pants worn by men.
Brekushe: for men and women.
Xhubleta : Only worn by women.
Mbështjellëse- Only worn by women.

Xhamadan 

A xhamadan is a traditional vest, which is worn by Albanian men throughout Albania, in Kosovo, North Macedonia, Serbia, Montenegro, and in the Arbëresh villages in Italy.

Brez 

Brez are traditional belts, which are worn by Albanian men throughout Albania, in Kosovo, North Macedonia, Serbia, Montenegro, and in the Arbëresh villages in Italy.

Çorape 

Çorape  are traditional socks which are worn by Albanian men throughout Albania, in Kosovo, North Macedonia, Serbia, Montenegro, and in the Arbëresh villages in Italy.Çorape are other known as socks. But they were part of traditions.

Opinga 

Opinga : (Art sandals), are traditional shoes which are worn by Albanian men throughout Albania, in Kosovo, North Macedonia, Serbia, Montenegro, and in the Arbëresh villages in Italy.

Gallery

See also
 Culture of Albania
 Albanian dances
 Traditional clothing of Kosovo
 Gjirokastër National Folklore Festival

References

Further reading

Albanian culture
Albanian traditions
 
Folk costumes